Autaugaville is a town in Autauga County, Alabama, United States. At the 2020 census, the population was 795. It is part of the Montgomery Metropolitan Statistical Area.

Geography
Autaugaville is located at  (32.432563, -86.658752).

The town is located in the central part of the state along Alabama State Route 14, which runs west to east through the center of town, leading east 14 mi (23 km) to Prattville, the Autauga County seat, and west 24 mi (39 km) to Selma.

History

William Thompson, the first settler in what is now Autaugaville arrived around 1820 and built a gristmill and sawmill on Swift Creek, about three miles upriver from the Alabama River. One source says that the town incorporated in 1839, but another cites 1907. A cotton mill opened in 1849 on the banks of Swift Creek, and following upon the model of industrialist Daniel Pratt, the owner constructed housing for its employees, expanding the town. It grew further when many citizens from nearby Vernon relocated here to escape the floods and diseases to which that town was prone. By 1851, the town had a population of 351 and claimed four stores, two churches, and two schools.

Additional businesses opened during this period, including a cloth factory, a buggy and wagon factory, and a gristmill, making it a thriving manufacturing center. The downtown area was seriously damaged by a fire in 1853, but quickly rebuilt. The town's first and only newspaper, the Autauga Citizen, also began publication in 1853, existing until 1873.

The Civil War and Reconstruction resulted in the closing of the town's factories, including the cotton factory, which saw its shipments seized by the U.S. government. The war and its aftermath essentially ended Autaugaville's status as a manufacturing center. The town incorporated in 1907, and the Alabama Central Railroad built a branch through town in 1911. At least one of several lumber mills operated periodically until the 1930s. In 1936, an Alabama Forestry Commission nursery opened near town. Crystal Lake Manufacturing Company makes brooms, mops, and handles in Autaugaville but closed at the end of 2020.

Education 
Autaugaville is part of the Autauga County School System and is home to Autaugaville School for prekindergarten to grade 12 students.

Demographics

Town of Autaugaville

Autaugaville first appeared on the census as an incorporated town in 1910. See Autaugaville Precinct below.

2020 Census data

As of the 2020 United States census, there were 795 people, 444 households, and 299 families residing in the town.

2010 Census data
As of the census of 2010, there were 870 people, 350 households, and 243 families residing in the town. The racial makeup of the town was 66.8% Black or African American, 31.3% White, 0.2% Native American, 0.3% from other races, and 1.4% from two or more races. 0.8% of the population were Hispanic or Latino of any race.

There were 350 households, of which 29.4% had children under the age of 18 living with them, 38.6% were married couples living together, 4.9% had a male householder with no wife present, 26.0% had a female householder with no husband present, and 30.6% were non-families. 26.6% of all households were made up of individuals. The average household size was 2.49 and the average family size was 3.00.

In the town, the population was spread out, with 27.1% under the age of 18, 8.5% from 18 to 24, 27.9% from 25 to 44, 24.6% from 45 to 64, and 11.9% who were 65 years of age or older. The median age was 36.3 years. For every 100 females, there were 91.1 males. For every 100 females age 18 and over, there were 87.6 males.

2000 Census data

As of the census of 2000, there were 820 people, 316 households, and 219 families residing in the town. The racial makeup of the town was 65.98% Black or African American, 32.32% White, 0.24% Native American, 0.24% from other races, and 1.22% from two or more races. 0.98% of the population were Hispanic or Latino of any race.

There were 316 households, out of which 34.5% had children under the age of 18 living with them, 39.6% were married couples living together, 25.0% had a female householder with no husband present, and 30.4% were non-families. 28.5% of all households were made up of individuals, and 13.6% had someone living alone who was 65 years of age or older. The average household size was 2.59 and the average family size was 3.18.

In the town, the population was spread out, with 31.1% under the age of 18, 8.9% from 18 to 24, 26.5% from 25 to 44, 20.2% from 45 to 64, and 13.3% who were 65 years of age or older. The median age was 33 years. For every 100 females, there were 86.4 males. For every 100 females age 18 and over, there were 78.8 males.

The median income for a household in the town was $22,563, and the median income for a family was $35,417. Males had a median income of $29,688 versus $19,821 for females. The per capita income for the town was $12,586. 27.1% of the population and 27.4% of families were below the poverty line. 31.2% of those under the age of 18 and 23.2% of those 65 and older were living below the poverty line.

Autaugaville Precinct/Division (1850-)

Autaugaville, the 2nd Beat of Autauga County, first reported a population for the 1850 U.S. Census (but not tabulated until the 1870 census). The low figure of 82, however, may have underreported the total population (as the population for the Prattville Beat was not reported and the figures for the remaining beats did not add up to the total county population for that census. It is also possible the figure was for the population of the town itself). As this was also just the population of White residents, it also ignored the substantial Black population in the area. In 1890, it became the 3rd Precinct (Autauga County) and continued to report to 1950. In 1960, Autaugaville precinct was changed to census division as part of a general reorganization of counties. Other than for the 1850 figure, which reported a White majority, the other censuses that reported racial demographics for precincts and divisions (1860–70; 1930–40; 1960-2010) reported a Black majority in each instance.

Notable people
 George "Wild Child" Butler, blues guitarist, harmonica player, and vocalist
 Albert J. Pickett, planter, lawyer, and Alabama's first historian. Born in Anson County, North Carolina, but moved to Autaugaville with his father at the age of 8.
Fernandez Ponds, U.S. Navy admiral

References

Notes

References

Towns in Alabama
Towns in Autauga County, Alabama
Montgomery metropolitan area
1839 establishments in Alabama
Populated places established in 1839